Margitta Pufe ( Ludewig, formerly known as Margitta Droese or Margitta Droese-Pufe, born 10 September 1952 in Gera, Thuringia), is a German track athlete, who from the mid-1970s to 1980 competed for the German Democratic Republic and was among the world's best shot putters and discus throwers. Her greatest achievement was winning a bronze medal at the 1980 Summer Olympic Games in Moscow in shot put.

Pufe started her career with SC Motor Jena and trained under Ingrid Kleppe. While competing, Pufe was 1.80 m tall and weighed 83 kg. 
After her competitive career came to an end, Pufe remained active in the sport as a shot put and discus coach first for VEB Carl Zeiss Jena and currently for TuS Jena.

International competitions

 1970 European Athletics Junior Championships: 3rd place in shot put, 6th place in Discus
 1976 Summer Olympics: 6th place in shot put (19.79 m, under the name Margitta Droese)
 1978 European Athletics Championships: 3rd place in shot put (18.06 – 19.59 – 20.28 – 20.58 – 20.48 – 20.31), 2nd place in discus (63.76 – 63.32 – foul – 64.04 – 63.34 – 63.96)
 1980 Summer Olympics: 3rd place in shot put (21.20 – 21.07 – 20.42 – 20.72 – 20.05 – 20.36), 5th place in discus (51.72 – 64.84 – 61.24 – 58.70 – foul – 66.12)

References

External links
European Championships

1952 births
Living people
Sportspeople from Gera
People from Bezirk Gera
East German female discus throwers
East German female shot putters
Olympic athletes of East Germany
Athletes (track and field) at the 1976 Summer Olympics
Athletes (track and field) at the 1980 Summer Olympics
European Athletics Championships medalists
Medalists at the 1980 Summer Olympics
Olympic bronze medalists for East Germany
Olympic bronze medalists in athletics (track and field)